The Fortis II government of Italy held office from 24 December 1905 until 8 February 1906, a total of 46 days, or 1 month and 15 days.

Government parties
The government was composed by the following parties:

The cabinet was externally supported by the Historical Right.

Composition

References

Italian governments
1905 establishments in Italy